Kō brothers may refer to:
 Kō no Moronao
 Kō no Moroyasu